Jatata Airport  is an airstrip serving Jatata, a riverside hamlet in the Pando Department of Bolivia. A short stretch of road just east of Jatata is used as the runway.

See also

Transport in Bolivia
List of airports in Bolivia

References

External links 
OpenStreetMap - Jatata
OurAirports - Jatata
FallingRain - Jatata Airport

Airports in Pando Department